Fernseea bocainensis is a plant species in the genus Fernseea.

This bromeliad is endemic to the Atlantic Forest biome (Mata Atlantica Brasileira) and to Rio de Janeiro (state) and São Paulo (state), located in southeastern Brazil.

References
 

bocainensis
Endemic flora of Brazil
Flora of Rio de Janeiro (state)
Flora of São Paulo (state)
Flora of the Atlantic Forest
Vulnerable flora of South America